The 2018 season was DPMM FC's 7th consecutive season in the top flight of Singapore football and in the Singapore Premier League. Along with the SGPL, the club will also compete in the Singapore Cup.

Squad

S.League squad

Coaching staff

Transfers

Mid-season transfers

In

Out

Pre-season transfers

In

Out

On Trial

Friendlies

Pre-season

Team statistics

Appearances and goals

Competitions

Overview

Singapore Premier League

Singapore Cup

See also 
 2017 DPMM FC season

References 

DPMM FC
DPMM FC seasons